Knowledge Organization: International Journal devoted to Concept Theory, Classification, Indexing, and Knowledge Representation is a peer-reviewed academic journal covering knowledge organization, including concept theory, classification, indexing, and knowledge representation. It is published by Ergon Verlag on behalf of the International Society for Knowledge Organization and was published under the title International Classification between 1974 and 1993. It was established in 1974 with Ingetraut Dahlberg as founding editor-in-chief.

Abstracting and indexing
The journal is abstracted and or indexed in Current Contents/Social & Behavioral Sciences, Social Sciences Citation Index, Inspec, Library and Information Science Abstracts, PASCAL, Referativny Zhurnal Informatika, and Sociological Abstracts. According to the Journal Citation Reports, the journal has a 2017 impact factor of 0.559.

See also
Document classification
Knowledge organization
Subject (documents)

References

External links

Information science journals
Publications established in 1974
8 times per year journals
English-language journals
me